Clathurella fuscobasis is a species of sea snail, a marine gastropod mollusk in the family Clathurellidae.

Description

Distribution
This species occurs in the Pacific Ocean along Easter Island.

References

fuscobasis